The 2018 Europe Top 16 Cup (also referred to as the China Construction Bank 2018 Europe Top 16 Cup for sponsorship reasons) was a table tennis competition held from 3–4 February in Montreux, Switzerland, organised under the authority of the European Table Tennis Union (ETTU). It was the 47th edition of the event, and the third time that it had been held in Switzerland.

Events were held in men's singles and women's singles, and the three medallists in each event qualified for the 2018 Men's and Women's World Cups.

Medallists

Men's singles

Players

Qualification was based on the European ranking for December 2017, with seedings based on the ranking for February 2018. Lionel Weber qualified as the host nation representative. Portugal's Marcos Freitas also qualified, but withdrew two days before the start of the competition due to injury. His place was taken by Kou Lei of Ukraine.

Draw

Women's singles

Players

Qualification was based on the European ranking for December 2017, with seedings based on the ranking for February 2018. Rachel Moret qualified as the host nation representative. Turkey's Melek Hu and Germany's Kristin Lang also qualified, but withdrew before the start of the competition, the latter due to having recently given birth. Their places were taken by Tetyana Bilenko of Ukraine and Viktoria Pavlovich of Belarus.

Draw

See also

 International Table Tennis Federation
 2018 ITTF-ATTU Asian Cup
 2018 ITTF-Oceania Cup
 2018 ITTF Pan-America Cup

References

External links

Official website

Europe Top 16 Cup
Table tennis competitions in Switzerland
International sports competitions hosted by Switzerland
Sport in Montreux
Europe Top 16 Cup
Top 16 Cup
Europe Top 16 Cup